RSS Vigilance (90) is the third ship of the Victory-class corvette of the Republic of Singapore Navy.

Construction and career
Vigilance was launched on 27 April 1989 by ST Engineering and was commissioned on 18 August 1990.

CARAT 2010 
RSS Vigilance, RSS Steadfast, RSS Persistence, MV Avatar, USNS Amelia Earhart, USS Russell, USS Chung-Hoon and USCGC Mellon participated in CARAT 2010.

Gallery

References

== External links ==

1989 ships
Ships built in Singapore
Victory-class corvettes